The Tour of the Zenne Valley was a men's road cycling road race that took place annually from 1962 to 1976 around Dworp, in Belgian Flemish Brabant.

The competition's roll of honor includes the successes of Rik Van Looy and Eddy Merckx.

Winners

References 

Cycle races in Belgium
1962 establishments in Belgium
Defunct cycling races in Belgium
Recurring sporting events established in 1962
Recurring sporting events disestablished in 1976
1976 disestablishments in Belgium